The 2003 Women's Churchill Cup was the fourth edition of the tournament, now rebranded the "Churchill Cup" and played at the same time as the men's event, took place at the Thunderbird Stadium in Vancouver. Only three countries took part - England joining the hosts and the United States.

A slightly different format saw the three nations compete in a round-robin, followed by a final between the top two. The result was the closest result yet with three of the four games being won by less than seven points.

Final table

Results

Group stage

Final

See also
Women's international rugby - includes all women's international match results
Churchill Cup

References

2003
2003 rugby union tournaments for national teams
International women's rugby union competitions hosted by Canada
2002–03 in English rugby union
2003 in Canadian rugby union
2003 in American rugby union
2003 in women's rugby union
Rugby union in British Columbia